The Seamen's Church Institute (SCI)--formerly the Seamen's Church Institute of New York and New Jersey (1976-2022)--founded in lower Manhattan in 1834 and affiliated with the Episcopal Church, serves mariners through education, pastoral care, and legal advocacy. With a budget of over $7 million, SCI is the largest, most comprehensive mariners’ agency in North America. Headquartered in New York, NY, the Institute operates a seafarers’ center in Port Newark, and maritime education facilities in Paducah, Kentucky, and Houston, Texas.

Annually, its chaplains visit more than 2,000 vessels in the Port of New York and New Jersey and along the American inland waterways system.

SCI provides free legal advice for merchant mariners worldwide and advocates for their rights to the United States Government, including the United States Congress, the Department of Homeland Security and the US Coast Guard, as well as other governments, the United Nations, the International Maritime Organization, the International Labour Organization, and maritime trade associations.

SCI instructors provide professional development and educational programs for inland and coastal mariners using simulator training facilities at SCI-Paducah and SCI-Houston.

SCI's Christmas at Sea program annually provides more than 25,000 hand-knit gifts to mariners at the holidays. CAS was founded in 1898 during the Spanish–American War.

SCI is led by the Reverend Mark S. Nestlehutt, President & Executive Director. Mr. Nestlehutt is an Episcopal minister who previously served in maritime parishes and as a naval officer.

Historical Highlights of SCI (1834–2023)
1834: SCI is founded as the Young Men's Church Missionary Society

1844: SCI builds the Floating Church of Our Savior at the foot of Pike Street on the East River to provide a place of worship where seafarers could feel comfortable and welcome

1846: SCI builds the Floating Church of the Holy Comforter at the foot of Dey Street on the North Hudson River to accommodate seafarers and local residents

1868: SCI builds its first mission house at 34 Pike Street in the bustling New York sailortown

1896:  The Joint Conference for the Protection of Seamen, a consortium of seafarers' missions and maritime law practitioners, was founded under the leadership of SCI administrators J. Augustus Johnson and the Rev. Archibald R. Mansfield.

1898: The Christmas at Sea program begins, supporting mariners during the Spanish–American War

1899: The beginnings of Maritime Education at SCI

1906: The Society formally changes its name to the Seamens Church Institute of New York

1908: Franklin D. Roosevelt joins SCI's Board, on which he remained until his death in 1945

1913: SCI opens the doors of its 12-story building at 25 South Street in lower Manhattan with room to house up to 580 seafarers in dormitory style rooms. The headquarters also housed a shipping bureau, a restaurant, a postal service and a chapel.

1917:  SCI begins training merchant marines for World War I

1920: Janet Lord Roper begins running the Missing Seamen's Bureau

1924: SCI opens an emergency homeless shelter for seafarers affected by the shipping industry’s economic downturn

1942: SCI's Merchant Marine School expands all the way through the 13th-story roof at 25 South Street to provide rooftop instruction and pilothouse training to meet increasing wartime demand for qualified seafarers

1961: SCI dedicates its International Seafarers’ Center in Port Newark, NJ

1968: SCI's New York City headquarters moves to an 18-story building at 15 State Street.  Services include a chapel, hotel rooms, restaurant and bar, reading room, post office and credit bureau

1976: Updates name from the Seamen's Church Institute of New York to the Seamen's Church Institute of New York & New Jersey to reflect its earlier expansion into New Jersey in 1961.

1978: SCI hosts its first Silver Bell Awards Dinner, an annual event to honor an individual or group for outstanding leadership in the maritime community, significant commitment to merchant mariners and engagement with issues facing the maritime industry

1982:  The Center for Seafarers’ Rights is established

1991: SCI's New York City headquarters moves to 241 Water Street.  The building housed a chapel, meeting rooms, legal aid offices, classrooms for maritime education and training, an art gallery, a cafeteria, and internet access and phones for mariners' use.

1997:  The Institute opens CME–Paducah in Kentucky, the first training facility of its kind for America's inland river mariners

1998:  Ministry on the River begins, the only full-time pastoral care service available to mariners working on America's inland river systems

2001:  SCI dedicates CME–Houston, a facility for maritime training in the Port of Houston

2001:  SCI's NYC headquarters is transformed into an emergency relief station for 9/11 rescue workers, providing thousands of meals and distributing truckloads of donated supplies to aid Ground Zero workers

2005: SCI raises and distributes over $155,000 for mariners affected by Hurricanes Katrina and Rita 

2009: SCI launches a groundbreaking study on the psychological effects of piracy on merchant mariners

2009: SCI assumes administrative responsibilities for the Life Saving Benevolent Association of New York (LSBA), an organization founded in 1849 to "“recognize and reward courage, skill and seamanship in the rescue of human life on the sea or any navigable waters..."

2010: SCI opens the doors to its renovated Seafarers' Center in Port Newark.  In addition to housing SCI's Center for Seafarer's Rights and Christmas at Sea programs, the new Center contains an Internet café, telephone carrels, recreation lounge, chapel, business services, and a Health and Wellness Center—all vital services for maritime transportation industry workers.

2011: SCI sells its headquarters building at 241 Water Street and transfers its archival collections to CUNY Queens College on permanent loan. The collections are housed at the College and open to researchers, in addition to serving as teaching resources for archives students in the Graduate School of Library and Information Studies.

2013:  SCI hosts first Mountain Challenge fundraiser team race over 25 miles of rugged terrain in western Maine

2014:  SCI moves to new headquarters at 50 Broadway in New York City

2015:  In response to the tragic loss of the MV El Faro with all hands in October 2015, SCI established the El Faro Relief Fund to provide financial assistance to the surviving families and dependents of lost seafarers of the El Faro and other U.S. flag merchant vessels

2016:  CME broadens its service offering to mariners through a new online Health, Safety and Environment e-learning program

2017:  SCI conducts its first two-day Applied Suicide Intervention Skills Training (ASIST) workshop for shore-side personnel in the inland river industry at CME-Paducah

2017:  CME becomes the first maritime training center in the United States to receive ISO 9001 certification for its quality management system

2018:  SCI celebrates the 120th anniversary of the Christmas at Sea program by launching the 1898 Society, a planned giving initiative for volunteer knitters

2018:  SCI’s Ministry on the River program opens a branch office in Baton Rouge, Louisiana

2019:  The U.S. Coast Guard publishes final regulations on seafarers’, chaplains’, and other persons’ access through marine terminals, culminating advocacy efforts by SCI that started in 2001 in the wake of the 9/11 terrorist attacks

2020:  SCI adapts to the COVID-19 health crisis by connecting with mariners safely via video chats, phone calls, and text messages; port chaplains arrange gangway visits and shop for seafarers unable to leave their vessels; river chaplains ramp up production and delivery of morale boxes, lowering them on ropes to towboats passing through locks; and volunteers send SCI a bumper crop of hand-knit items for Christmas at Sea gifts.  

2021:  SCI’s Center for Mariner Advocacy (CMA), formerly known as the Center for Seafarer Rights, relocated its office to New Orleans, Louisiana.

2022: Updates name to the Seamen's Church Institute, reflecting its geographic expansion with physical structures in five states and a network of chaplains located in more than a dozen states within the U.S.

Pastoral Care and Chaplaincy Services
In the Port of New York and New Jersey, SCI chaplains visit thousands of vessels annually, providing practical services to crews and offering hospitality and pastoral care. Seafarers are offered free transportation services to and from their vessel, enabling them to visit local shopping areas. Those who visit the SCI International Seafarers' Center in Port Newark can access the Internet, contact their families at home, and enjoy a range of other amenities free of charge.

SCI's Ministry on the Rivers (MOR) program reaches out to mariners and maritime workers on the inland waterways and in the Gulf of Mexico. Two full-time chaplains and more than a dozen part-time volunteer river chaplain associates board towboats and offshore vessels to offer pastoral care and hospitality.

Maritime Education & Training and Feasibility Safety Studies
SCI instructors provide professional development and educational programs for inland and coastal mariners using advanced simulator training at facilities in Paducah, Kentucky and Houston, Texas. SCI also conducts feasibility studies that serve to make waterways and commercial ports safer. Feasibility studies are performed to ensure that safety parameters are evaluated and met, traffic flow is not negatively impacted, and safe navigation is maintained.

Mariner Advocacy
SCI's Center for Seafarer Rights (CSR) is the world's only free legal-aid program for merchant mariners. Available for consultation at any time, CSR mediates between parties to reach a resolution acceptable to everyone, often referring individual mariners to pro-bono law firms for assistance. Working with seafarer advocacy and international groups from around the world, CSR has been instrumental in improving safety and security for mariners, as well as implementing new standards relating to stowaways, piracy, repatriation, medical care and shore leave.

Taking on a new dimension to advocacy, in 2012 CSR published guidelines on "The Psychological Impact of Piracy on Seafarers". This has been followed by various studies on health and wellness among seafarers and inland mariners, including the introduction of suicide intervention training in 2017.

Christmas at Sea
With more than 1,200 knitters and crocheters drawn from all 50 states, Canada and Europe, SCI's Christmas at Sea program provides over 16,000 handcrafted gifts to merchant mariners working over the Christmas holidays.  Begun in 1898 during the Spanish–American War, Christmas at Sea relies on SCI chaplains who distribute gifts to international seafarers, inland river mariners and offshore workers in the Gulf of Mexico throughout the holiday season. Handcrafted items such as hats, scarves, slippers, or cowls are placed into “ditty bags” with various toiletries, candy or treats, and holiday cards made by schoolchildren are added into the care package for the mariners.

Archives
SCI has an extensive physical archive collection located at Queens College, City University of New York. The Institute has also digitized a portion of its archives.

Notes

Other references
 PBS Religion and Ethics Newsweekly, January 7, 2011
 Seamen's Church Institute Charts New Course for 21st-Century Ministry, Episcopal Life Online, October 15, 2010
 Seamen's Knit 4 Lent initiative to serve mariners working in Gulf Coast, Episcopal Life Online, February 7, 2008
 David M. Rider named president, executive director of Seamen's Church Institute, Episcopal Life Online, October 2, 2007 https://web.archive.org/web/20080217041310/http://www.episcopalchurch.org/81831_90629_ENG_HTM.htm
 COREY KILGANNON,  Men of the Sea, Marooned at the Ramada, The New York Times, New York and Region, January 22, 2005
 DANIEL J. WAKIN,  Marooned, Just Feet From Shore; Tighter Security Keeps Foreign Crews on Ships , The New York Times, New York and Region, July 24, 2003
 JEAN SMITH (Rev.), A Seaman's Plight, The New York Times, Opinion, December 5, 2001
 George Harding, On Admiralty Service, Harpers Magazine, December 1917
 Norman Duncan, Youngsters of the seven seas, Harpers Magazine, December 1910

External links

Christmas at Sea project
SCITV Vimeo channel

United States Merchant Marine
Social welfare charities based in the United States
Episcopal Church (United States)
Christianity in New York City
Organizations based in New York (state)
Anglican organizations
Port of New York and New Jersey
1834 establishments in New York (state)
Organizations based in Newark, New Jersey